George Sossenko (sometimes Georges Sossenko; December 20, 1918 – March 14, 2013) was a Russian-born American lecturer and activist. At age 17, he left his parents' home in Paris, France, to join those fighting against Francisco Franco's nationalist forces in the Spanish Civil War. He initially went to the offices of the French Communist Party, but was turned away, and then denied by the Socialists as well. They suggested he contact the anarchists, who sent him across the Spanish border in a caravan. He was sent to Barcelona, then received one week's worth of military training before being sent to the front. During the Civil War, Sossenko changed his name to Georges Jorat to avoid being found by his parents, and fought as part of the Sébastien Faure Century, the French-speaking contingent of the Durruti Column. He later joined the International Brigades. After the Civil War, Sossenko later fought in World War II with the Free French. and with in United States Fifth Army in Italy.

Later on, Sossenko went to work for Michelin Tire as a mechanical engineer. He first worked in Texas, but was transferred to Atlanta, Georgia. In 1984, Sossenko sued Michelin (Sossenko v. Michelin Corp., 172 Ga. App. 71 (1984)) after being threatened with losing his job. He lived in Atlanta with his wife Bernice for the remainder of his life. In 2004, Sossenko published a Spanish-language book titled Aventurero Idealista.

References

External links
Video of George Sossenko speaking about World War II
George Sossenko's obituary

1918 births
2013 deaths
People from Atlanta
Abraham Lincoln Brigade members
American people of the Spanish Civil War
Russian people of the Spanish Civil War
American people of Russian descent
Writers from Georgia (U.S. state)
Soviet emigrants to the United States
American expatriates in France